Machinery's Handbook for machine shop and drafting-room; a reference book on machine design and shop practice for the mechanical engineer, draftsman, toolmaker, and machinist (the full title of the 1st edition) is a classic reference work in mechanical engineering and practical workshop mechanics in one volume published by Industrial Press, New York, since 1914. The first edition was created by Erik Oberg (1881–1951) and Franklin D. Jones (1879–1967), who are still mentioned on the title page of the 29th edition (2012). Recent editions of the handbook contain chapters on mathematics, mechanics, materials, measuring, toolmaking, manufacturing, threading, gears, and machine elements, combined with excerpts from ANSI standards. The work is available in online and ebook form as well as print.  

During the decades from World War I to World War II, these phrases could refer to either of two competing reference books: McGraw-Hill's American Machinists' Handbook or Industrial Press's Machinery's Handbook. The former book ceased publication after the 8th edition (1945). (One short-lived spin-off appeared in 1955.) The latter book, Machinery's Handbook, is still regularly revised and updated, and it continues to be a "bible of the metalworking industries" today.

Machinery's Handbook is apparently the direct inspiration for similar works in other countries, such as Sweden's Karlebo handbok (1st ed. 1936).

Machinery's Encyclopedia 
In 1917, Oberg and Jones also published Machinery's Encyclopedia in 7 volumes. The handbook and encyclopedia are named after the monthly magazine Machinery (Industrial Press, 1894–1973), where the two were consulting editors.

See also
 Machinist Calculator
 Kempe's Engineers Year-Book

External links
Industrial Press website
History of Machinery's Handbook

References
 

1914 non-fiction books
Mechanical engineering
Handbooks and manuals
Metallurgical industry of the United States